Riusciranno i nostri eroi a ritrovare l'amico misteriosamente scomparso in Africa?, internationally released as Will Our Heroes Be Able to Find Their Friend Who Has Mysteriously Disappeared in Africa?, is a 1968 Italian comedy film directed by Ettore Scola. Production of the film started in 1965, with the working title Mister Sabatini, suppongo (Mister Sabatini, I suppose). It started a trend in Italian cinema of using extremely long names for movies.

The film was the sixth highest grossing release at the Italian box office in the 1968/69 season. The plot is loosely based on books by Salgari, Verne, Conrad that Scola read as a child  and on Italian Disney comics artist Romano Scarpa's comic Topolino e il Pippotarzan (1957).

Plot
The Roman businessman Fausto Di Salvio can no longer stand his work and his sloppy and emotionless way of life. The chance to escape from this "prison" occurs when the news of the death of his brother-in-law, Oreste Sabbatini, known as "Titino", arrives from Africa. Fausto, with his employee Ubaldo, his firm's accountant, leaves immediately to Angola in search of Titino, a journey that will take many months of travel and will involve them in many adventures. They follow in Titino's tracks, but it seems that he cannot be found. From what they learn by speaking to people who have met him, Titino appears to be a man of many resources who has left behind him many people crazy of him, but even someone who was cheated by him and who would be glad to lay hands on him.

As they lose hope that they will ever find Titino, Fausto and Ubaldo are captured by a tribe of natives who turn out to be governed by the shaman Oreste, the brother-in-law of Fausto. They propose to Titino to come back with them to Italy. After some hesitation, Titino makes up his mind to follow them to Italy, but when they are on board the vessel leaving the site where he has lived with the natives, he cannot bear separation from the tribe, who welcomed and loved him for so long. So he jumps off the ship leaving for Europe and swims to his beloved people.

Cast 
 Alberto Sordi: Fausto Di Salvio
 Nino Manfredi: Oreste Sabatini (Titino)
 Bernard Blier: Ubaldo Palmarini
 Giuliana Lojodice: Marisa
 Franca Bettoia: Rita
 Manuel Zarzo: Pedro Tomeo
 Erika Blanc: Genevieve

References

External links

1968 films
Italian satirical films
Commedia all'italiana
Films directed by Ettore Scola
Films set in Rome
Films set in Angola
Films based on Italian comics
Films with screenplays by Age & Scarpelli
Films scored by Armando Trovajoli
Films with screenplays by Ettore Scola
Films based on works by Joseph Conrad
1960s Italian-language films
1960s Italian films